Free writing is traditionally regarded as a prewriting technique practiced in academic environments, in which a person writes continuously for a set period of time with limited concern for rhetoric, conventions, and mechanics, sometimes working from a specific prompt provided by a teacher. While free writing often produces raw, or even unusable material, it can help writers overcome writing blocks and build confidence by allowing them to practice text-production phases of the writing process without the fear of censure. Some writers even use the technique to collect initial thoughts and ideas on a topic, often as a preliminary to formal writing.

Unlike brainstorming, where ideas are listed or organized, a free-written paragraph is comparatively formless or unstructured.

History
Dorothea Brande was an early proponent of freewriting. In her book Becoming a Writer (1934), she advises readers to sit and write for 15 minutes every morning, as fast as they can. She argues that doing so for just 15 minutes helps writers to avoid having the feeling of commitment. Instead of believing that writing can become dull, writers can compromise for as little as 15 minutes to liberate ideas and put them on paper. She also argued that this practice would help authors to not fear blank pages when they start to write.

Peter Elbow advanced freewriting in his book Writing Without Teachers (1973). He pointed out the importance of writing as a liberating activity. Mentioning that when “freewriting” the author can break any restrictions they may have when writing. He pointed out that when writing in regular basics one is extremely focused on the mistakes and avoids certain words or ideas for fear. Instead, freewriting promotes writers to produce ideas more quickly because they forget to edit as they write.

The idea of freewriting has been popularized by Julia Cameron through her book The Artist's Way (1992). She presents the method of “morning pages” which demands that the author write three pages every morning to get ideas out. She saw this as a helpful technique to combat the blockages that writers may have.

Technique
The technique involves continuous writing, usually for a predetermined period of time (often from five to fifteen minutes). The writer writes with no regards to spelling or grammar, and makes no corrections. If the writer reaches a point where they can't think of anything to write, it is presumed that they will continue to write about whichever ideas come to their mind. The writer is free to strays off topic and let thoughts lead where they may. At times, a writer may also perform a focused freewrite, letting a chosen topic structure their thoughts. Expanding from this topic, the thoughts may stray to make connections and create more abstract views on the topic. This technique helps a writer explore a particular subject before putting ideas into a more basic context.

Freewriting is often done on a daily basis as a part of the writer's daily routine. Also, students in many writing courses are assigned to do such daily writing exercises.

The writing does not have to be done with pen and paper. A technique known as Free blogging combines blogging with free-writing with the rules changed so that the writer does not stop typing for long periods of time. The end result may or may not be shared with the public.

Evolution of free blogging from early 2000's to now 
As the times progress, free writing has evolved with the times as more online platforms and mediums have opened up. With sites opening up like Tumblr in 2007 and Twitter in 2006, there was another boon in online traffic that we can observe today. If you have an interest or hobby, you can find or create a blog post for people with similar passions. For any thought that you want to share with the world Twitter has become the medium for such a thing as well as being able to connect with a large number of people at any time. Over the years, even as Tumblr has gone down in usership, it is still a heavily traffic site that helped grow a multitude of communities. Twitter currently holds on top for one of the largest bases of users actively writing and sharing their thoughts to the world furthering change how we free write.

Rationale
Free writing is based on a presumption that, while everyone has something to say and the ability to say it, the mental wellspring may be blocked by apathy, self-criticism, resentment, anxiety about deadlines, fear of failure or censure, or other forms of resistance. The accepted rules of free-writing enable a writer to build up enough momentum to blast past blocks into uninhibited flow, the concept outlined by writing teachers such as Louise Dunlap, Peter Elbow, and Natalie Goldberg.

Free-writing is all about loosening and limbering the thought process, not about a product or a performance for a student or a writer.

Use in education
Often free-writing workshops focus on self-expression, and are sometimes even used in teaching elementary school children. There is no common consensus on the acceptance of this technique, often referred as Natalie Goldberg's first four rules of writing:
The writer gives themselves a time limit. Writing for one or ten or twenty minutes, and then stopping.
The writer should keep their hands moving until the time is up. They should not pause to stare into space or to read what they've written. They should write quickly but not in a hurry.
The writer should pay no attention to grammar, spelling, punctuation, neatness, or style. Nobody else needs to read what they've produced here. The correctness and quality of what is written do not matter; the act of writing does.
If the writer gets off the topic or runs out of ideas, they should keep writing anyway. If necessary, they can write nonsense or whatever comes into their head, or simply scribble: anything to keep the hand moving.
If the writer feels bored or uncomfortable as they're writing, they should ask themselves what's bothering them and write about that.
When the time is up, the writer should look over what they've written, and mark passages that contain ideas or phrases that might be worth keeping or elaborating on in a subsequent free-writing session.

Goldberg's rules appear to be based on those developed by Jack Kerouac, whom she cites several times. Kerouac developed 30 "rules" in his Belief & Technique for Modern Prose. While Kerouac's "rules" are elliptical and even cryptic for beginning writers, they are more comprehensive than Goldberg's for those who have practiced prose writing for some time. Kerouac supplemented these with his Essentials of Spontaneous Prose, and together they form the basis of his prose writing method, a form of narrative stream of consciousness. Kerouac himself cites the "trance writing" of William Butler Yeats as a precursor of his own practice.

Goldberg's rules, which are infused with the study and practice of Zen Buddhism, make the process of free writing more accessible for a beginner and are perhaps less extreme than those of Kerouac, although they are still tinged with an element of mysticism.

Criticisms and Critiques 
The effectiveness of free writing remains a disputed topic within the field of writing studies. Charles Piltch expressed concerns that the lack of time for preparation before writing may produce work that is not suitable for academic settings. Furthermore, Piltch notes that students who practice free writing are more reluctant to revising or editing their work and often produce insincere writing. Raymond Rodrigues argues that free writing minimizes the role of skilled instruction in writing studies and wrongfully equates fluid writing to good writing. The research presented in George Hillock's Research on Writing Composition states that although free writing is superior to emphasizing grammar and mechanics, using writing models with qualitative criteria produces the best writing.

See also

Asemic writing
Jack Kerouac
Natalie Goldberg
Stream of consciousness
The Most Dangerous Writing App

References

Further reading

Writing